The Magadan Oblast Duma is the regional parliament of Magadan Oblast, a federal subject of Russia. A total of 21 representatives are elected for a five-year terms, with 11 of them by party list and 10 by constituency. The parliament's seat is in the city of Magadan.

Elections

2020

List of chairmen

Sources
Duma website

References

Magadan
Russian Far East
Politics of Magadan Oblast